Alparslan: Büyük Selçuklu is a Turkish historical action drama series written by Serdar Özönalan, directed by Sedat İnci and produced by Emre Konuk. As a prequel to Uyanış: Büyük Selçuklu, it depicts the political events and wars during Alp Arslan's rule as a  Prince of the Seljuk Empire. In the series, Turkish actor Barış Arduç essays the lead role of Alp Arslan.

The series was filmed on the TRT International Film Studios at various locations including Sakarya, Istanbul and Kocaeli. Turkish musician Gökhan Kırdar composed the opening theme while Kazakh musicians composed other music using instruments from the Turkic world. Alparslan : Büyük Selçuklu premiered on TRT 1 on 8 November 2021. The second season of the show premiered on 19 September 2022.

Plot 

On the day that the Seljuk Sultan Tugrul will appoint his heir, he receives the news that the Byzantines killed innocent Turks, including women and children. He orders an expedition to Anatolia. Mysterious assassins attack the Seljuk meliks who went on a campaign. The traces of the attack take  Alparslan to a place he never expected.
While Alparslan is after the assassins, he saves the life of a Turkmen girl named Akça Hatun , who escaped from Byzantine persecution. However, he is unaware of the secrets Akça hides behind her beauty. The Byzantine Emperor sends General Dukas and Captain Romanos Diogenes to Ani to solve the problems with the Turkmen. However, the mistake made by Yannis, son of Ani Tekfur Kekavmenos, causes Sultan Tuğrul to decide on war. Alparslan, who was given the good news of conquests in his dreams as a child, comes face to face with Byzantium in Pasinler with the Seljuk army. Pasinler will be the first step for Alparslan on his blessed path to open the doors of Anatolia to the Turks.
After winning the battle of Pasinler, Sultan Tugrul declares his heir, Alparslan. However, removed himself from the state, so he could fight the Christians. 

Alparslan and Akca plan to marry. He realizes Akca is a spy for Tekfur Kekavmenos but she changes her heart and works for Seljuk. Meanwhile, Emir Bozan feels cornered and plays his final move: killing Sultan Mevdud of Ghazni, Sehver's husband. When Sehver goes to tell Cagri Bey, her father, but Emir Bozan threatens her to start a throne war which would kill her child. Sehver tries to tell Cagri Bey with a note, but Karaca catches the note and asks Emir Bozan if the note is true. 
Karaca, is mad with Akca, because she told Cagri that the reason for his daughter Sevher's death was Karaca. Karaca loses her baby and then her life too.

Akca dies in Vaspurakan while they were conquering it, before getting to marry Alparslan. Alparslan hangs Kekavmenos, and Vaspurakan is theirs again. 

Season 2

Season 2 starts with Alparslan doing Hajj. 
They fight against Arslan Yusuf, the killer of Ibrahim Yinal's and Erbaskan's father. 

Alparslan is ordered by Sultan Tugrul to spare Yusuf's life, much to Yinal's detest. He is also ordered to marry Seferyi Hatun,daughter of Yusuf, which neither she or Alparslan are wanting, Alparslan due to the love and status of Aybike in his heart.Yinal is captured for trying to sell Steel to the enemies secretly, which Erbaskan told Alparslan. Alpagut, Alparslan's spy in Vaspurakan is called by the new Ani Tekfur, Gregor. Seferiye does not want this marriage. She stabs Alparslan on his shoulder at the end of the episode 1 of season 2. Alparslan marries her and slowly their love starts building. Arslan Yusuf turns out to be a traitor much to Seferiye's sadness . Gulce, Seferiye's sister comes to Vaspurakan on Alparslan's order. Seferiye starts loving her husband and he does too. Arslan Besasiri comes in and forms an alliance with Yinal. Yinal turns out to be a traitor much to the detest of Tugrul and Chagri his elder half brothers. Sulayman, Alparslan's brother, falls in love with Tekfur Grigor's daughter, Flora. Chagri gets badly wounded but lives only to get killed a short time later. Seferiye loves her husband. Grigor captures her and wants Alparslan to give up on Vaspurakan and Surmari Inn. Alparslan saves Seferiye, only to watch Kutalmis Bey, a bey who united with Yinal Bey, kill Tekfur 
Grigor's son, Alexander. Flora does not love Sulayman anymore. Seferiye gives birth to Meliksah. Count Leon appears in Ani. Erbaskan sides with Kutalmis Bey and pulls Gevher into the issue. Sulayman is declared the heir. Turns out later, Celal, the spy of Bessasiri in the palace is actually Altuncan Hatuns dead son, Enusirvan. Celal tries to kill the Sultan, but Altuncan hatun kills him and falls in deppression, leading her death. Sultan Tughrul too falls ill, and his vizier, Amidulmulk, sets Sulayman as temporary Sultan. Kutalmis Bey asks Sulayman for Khorasan, which is Cagri bey's legacy to his sons. Sulayman agrees, Despite what Alparslan says. Kutalmis and Alparslan fight for Merv Tribe. Count Leon forces Seferiye and all the alps in Vaspurakan to leave. Merv Tribe belongs to Kutalmis Bey. Selcen Hatun is mad with her son for doing such a thing.

Cast

Main 
 Barış Arduç as Alparslan: a Seljuk Melik, husband of Seferiya Hatun, son of Çağrı Bey, nephew of Tuğrul Bey .
 Kayra Zabcı as Seferiye Hatun: wife of Alparslan, daughter of Emir Arslan Yusuf, elder sister of Gülce Hatun, descended from Karakhanids.
 Mehmet Özgür as Nizamülmülk (Hasan): a Seljuk official. Father of Akça "Aybike" Hatun. Özgür reprises his role from Uyanış: Büyük Selçuklu.
 Barış Bağcı as Tuğrul Bey: founder of the Seljuk Empire.
 Erdinç Gülener as Çağrı Bey: father of Alparslan, Kavurd, Begim Şehver, Süleyman and Gevher Hatun.
 Serhat Tutumluer as Tekfur Grigor.
 Sarp Levendoğlu as Romanos IV Diogenes
 Bora Cengiz as Alexander.

Recurring 
 Umut Karadağ as Emir Arslan Yusuf: son of Ali Tegin, father of Seferiye Hatun and Gülce Hatun, descended from Karakhanids.
 Korel Cezayirli as Süleyman: brother of Alparslan and Kavurd, son of Çağrı Bey, and widower of Karaca Hatun. 
 Fırat Topkorur as Alpagut, son of Temurleng and Akınay Hatun.
 Sinan Tuzcu as Constantine X Doukas.
 Esra Kızıldoğan as Altuncan Hatun: Tuğrul Bey's wife.
 Uygar Özçelik as İbrahim Yınal: the maternal half brother of Tuğrul Bey and Çağrı Bey. He is the uncle of Alparslan, Kavurd and Süleyman.
 Betül Çobanoğlu as Selcan Hatun: wife of Çağrı Bey.
 Öykü Gürman as Öke Hatun: wife of Ibrahim Yınal Bey.
 Hakan Şahin as Kündürî.
 Esila Umut as Gevher Hatun: sister of Alparslan, Kavurd, Süleyman and Begim Şehver.
 Burak Ali Özkan as Shehzade Mesud, son of the Ghaznavid State emperor Sultan Mevdud and Begum Sehver Sultan, grandson of Çağrı Bey, nephew of Alparslan.
 Ayşegül Ünsal as Akınay Hatun, mother of Alpagut, widow of Temurleng.
 Burak Şafak as Avar Alp.
 Onur Aycelik as Artuk Alp.
 Kutay Sungar as Atsız Alp.
 Emre Bulut as Afşin Alp.
 Merve Nil Güder as Gülce Hatun, daughter of Emir Arslan Yusuf, younger sister of Seferiye Hatun. 
 Cihan Muğlu as Serdar Alp.

Season 1 
 Fahriye Evcen as Akça "Aybike" Hatun (Maria): Alparslan's fiancée, daughter of Nizamülmülk and Meryem Hatun (Maria)(deceased).
 Yurdaer Okur as Tuğrul Bozan, an Emir in  Ghaznavids. But actually leader of forbidden Shia Islam organisation Qarmatians, killed Begin Sehver Sultan and assassinated Sultan Mevdud. Gets beheaded by Alparslan. (deceased).
 Toprak Sergen as Katakalon Kekaumenos, a Byzantine Tekfur (deceased).
 Emre Kızılırmak as Georgian Prince Rati, son of Prince Liparit.
 Mehmet Ünal as Georgian Prince Ivan, son of Prince Liparit.
 Saner Pakoglu as Liparit IV of Kldekari, Georgian Prince, general, and political figure that get caught by Seljuk in a war. (Deceased)
 Gizem Karaca as Eudokia Makrembolitissa
 Zeynep Özder as Begim Şehver Sultan: daughter of Çağrı Bey, the wife of the Ghaznavid Sultan Mevdud and the sister of Alparslan, Kavurd,  Süleyman and Gevher Hatun (deceased).
 Metehan Şahiner as Prince Yannis, Tekfur Kekavmenos son. (deceased).
 Rabia Soytürk as Karaca Hatun: Süleyman's wife, Tuğrul Bozan's sister (deceased).
 Burak Demir as Hervé Frankopoulos : a Norman mercenary general in Byzantine service during the 1050s, former friend and enemy of Katakalon Kekavmenos.

Episodes

Marketing 
On 7 September 2021, director Emre Konuk released a title sequence for the first episode.

References

External links 
 (in Turkish)

Alparslan: Büyük Selçuklu English (in English)
Alparslan: Büyük Selçuklu Spanish (in Spanish)

Uyanış: Büyük Selçuklu
2021 Turkish television series debuts
Isfahan in fiction
Television series about Islam
Television series produced in Istanbul
Television series set in the 11th century
Turkish action television series
Turkish drama television series
Turkish historical television series
Turkish Radio and Television Corporation original programming
Turkish-language television shows
War drama television series